Gorgyra bina, the Bina leaf sitter, is a butterfly in the family Hesperiidae. It is found in Sierra Leone, Liberia, Ghana, Nigeria, Cameroon, Gabon, the Republic of the Congo, the Democratic Republic of the Congo, Uganda and north-western Tanzania. The habitat consists of forests.

References

Butterflies described in 1937
Erionotini